Martin Fischer and Philipp Oswald were the defending champions, but decided not to participate.
Tomasz Bednarek and Mateusz Kowalczyk won this tournament by defeating Alexander Bury and Andrei Vasilevski 6–2, 6–4 in the final.

Seeds

Draw

Draw

References
 Main Draw

Sicilia Classic - Doubles
Sicilia Classic